Totivirus is a genus of double-stranded RNA viruses in the family Totiviridae. Fungi serve as natural hosts. The name of the group derives from Latin toti which means undivided or whole. There are seven species in this genus.

Structure
Viruses in the genus Totivirus are non-enveloped, with icosahedral symmetry, and T=2 architecture. The diameter is around 40 nm.

Genome

Totiviruses have a genome of 4700–6700 nucleotides in length and only a single copy of the genome is present in the particle. The nucleic acid content of a totivirus capsid is usually of one segment but can also contain three or four segments of linear double stranded RNA. The genome contains two large overlapping open reading frames (ORFs). These open reading frames (ORFs) code for a capsid protein (CP) and an RNA-dependent RNA polymerase (RdRp). The 5' end of the positive strand of the dsRNA genome has no cap and is very structured.  Totiviruses contain a long 5' untranslated region (5' UTR) which functions as an internal ribosome entry site (IRES). Totiviruses can have satellite RNAs encoding a toxin.

Life cycle

Viral replication is cytoplasmic. Entry into the host cell is achieved by virus remains intracellular. Replication follows the double-stranded RNA virus replication model. Double-stranded RNA virus transcription is the method of transcription. Translation takes place by -1 ribosomal frameshifting. The virus exits the host cell by cell-to-cell movement. Fungi Saccharomyces cerevisiae and smut serve as the natural host. The virus is transmitted during cell division, sporogenesis, and cell fusion.

Taxonomy 
The genus Totivirus contains the member species:
 Saccharomyces cerevisiae virus L-A
 Saccharomyces cerevisiae virus LBCLa
 Scheffersomyces segobiensis virus L
 Tuber aestivum virus 1
 Ustilago maydis virus H1
 Xanthophyllomyces dendrorhous virus L1A
 Xanthophyllomyces dendrorhous virus L1B

References

External links 
 ICTV Totivirus Page
 Viralzone: Totivirus
 ICTV

Totiviridae
Mycoviruses
Virus genera